John Neil Helmer (19 January 1938 – 14 August 1982) was  a former Australian rules footballer who played with Geelong in the Victorian Football League (VFL).

Family
The son of Neil William Hans "Larry" Helmer (1912-1972), and Viola Veronica Helmer (1913-2001), née Gallagher, John Neil Helmer was born at Mooroopna, Victoria on 19 January 1938.

He was the nephew of Clyde Helmer.

He married Lesley Lorraine Wray (1940-2014).

Notes

References

External links 		
 		
 		
 John Helmer, at Boyles Football Photos.	
			
			
1938 births		
1982 deaths		
Australian rules footballers from Victoria (Australia)		
Geelong Football Club players
Shepparton Football Club players